Medical University of the Americas (MUA) is a private for-profit offshore medical school in Charlestown, Nevis. It is owned by R3 Education, Inc. which also owns St. Matthew's University and Saba University School of Medicine MUA confers upon its graduates the Doctor of Medicine (MD) degree. 

Students at MUA are primarily from the US and Canada and return to those countries to practice medicine. A typical incoming class at MUA is about 150 students.

Curriculum 

MUA has a 4-year curriculum leading to a Doctor of Medicine degree. The first two years consist of five semesters of basic sciences taught by approximately 45 full-time faculty with credentials from the United States, United Kingdom, Canadian or Asian universities. After finalizing the basic sciences part of the curriculum, MUA requires students to pass the United States Medical Licensing Examination (USMLE) Step 1 prior to starting clinical rotations. The final two years are considered the clinical medicine curriculum, which is completed in affiliated teaching hospitals in the United States and Canada. The major clerkship programs have accreditation from the Accreditation Council for Graduate Medical Education, American Osteopathic Association or the Royal College of Physicians and Surgeons of Canada. Passing USMLE Step 2 is required for graduation.

Pre-medical Program 
For students that lack the pre-medical education requirements, MUA offers a Pre-Medical Program on its campus in Nevis.

Accreditation, Recognition and Approval
MUA is accredited by the Accreditation Commission of Colleges of Medicine. MUA is accredited by the government of St. Kitts & Nevis Accreditation Board.

MUA is listed in the World Directory of Medical Schools. It was also listed in the now discontinued FAIMER International Medical Education Directory (IMED) and in the AVICENNA Directory for medicine.

MUA has received a comparability determination from the National Committee on Foreign Medical Education and Accreditation (NCFMEA)

Medical University of the Americas has been approved to participate in the William D. Ford Federal Direct Unsubsidized Stafford and Grad PLUS Loan programs, which are both administered by the U.S. Department of Education.

On July 27, 2017, Medical Board of California voted to approve and recognize the Medical University of the Americas, Nevis. The approval recognizes credentials of students who matriculated as from May 2015 onward when the new curriculum was implemented.

MUA is approved by the New York State Education Department for clinical training, residency, and licensure in New York. MUA is approved by the New York State Education Department (NYSED) to allow students to complete more than 12 weeks of clinical clerkships in New York State. MUA is one of eight Caribbean medical schools so approved by NYSED.

MUA has received approval by The Commission for Independent Education, and Florida Department of Education for licensure.

See also 
 International medical graduate
 List of medical schools in the Caribbean

References

External links
 

Medical schools in Saint Kitts and Nevis
Buildings and structures in Nevis